A transit bus (also big bus, commuter bus, city bus, town bus, urban bus, stage bus, public bus,  public transit bus, or simply bus) is a type of bus used on shorter-distance public transport bus services.  Several configurations are used, including low-floor buses, high-floor buses, double-decker buses, articulated buses and midibuses.

These are distinct from all-seated coaches used for longer distance journeys and smaller minibuses, for more flexible services.

Specifications
Generally, a transit bus will have:
 large and sometimes multiple doors for ease of boarding and exiting
 minimal or no luggage space
 bench or bucket seats, with no coachlike head-rests
 destination blinds / displays such as headsigns or rollsigns or electronic dot matrix/LED signs
 legal standing-passenger capacity
 fare taking/verification equipment
 pull cord or bus stop request button

Modern transit buses are also increasingly being equipped with passenger information systems, multimedia, WiFi, USB charging points, entertainment/advertising, and passenger comforts such as heating and air-conditioning (as opposed to historically where actually necessary). Some industry members and commentators promote the idea of making the interior of a transit bus as inviting as a private car, recognising the chief competitor to the transit bus in most markets.

History

Operations
As they are used in a public transport role, transit buses can be operated by publicly run transit authorities or municipal bus companies, as well as private transport companies on a public contract or fully independent basis.  Due to the local authority use, transit buses are often built to a third-party specification put to the manufacturer by the authority.  Early examples of such specification include the Greater Manchester Leyland Atlantean, and DMS-class London Daimler Fleetline.  New transit buses may be purchased each time a route/area is contracted, such as in the London Buses tendering system.

The operating area of a transit bus may also be defined as a geographic metropolitan area, with the buses used outside of this area being more varied with buses purchased with other factors in mind. Some regional-size operators for capital cost reasons may use transit buses interchangeably on short urban routes as well as longer rural routes, sometimes up to 2 or 3 hours.  Often transit bus operators have a selection of 'dual-purpose' fitted buses, that is standard transit buses fitted with coach-type seating, for longer-distance routes.

Sometimes transit buses may also be used as express buses on a limited-stopping or non-stop service at peak times, but over the same distance as the regular route.

Fare payment
Fare payment is done via:

 Smart card
 single or multi-ride coupon/ticket
 cash
 (none required: Zero-fare bus)
and is done upon:
 Pre-payment, done at ticket machines located at the bus stops or at other locations, before getting on the bus.
 boarding
 departing
 both, e.g., after crossing fare zone boundaries
 in transit, via an attendant or bus conductor (mostly obsolete systems)

Doors
Depending on payment systems in different municipalities, there are widely different rules with regard to which door, front or rear, one must use when boarding/exiting.

For rear doors, most buses have doors opened by the driver controls or patron (with touch-to-open, motion sensor or push bars). Most doors on buses use air-assist technology, the driver controlled doors, use air pressure to force them open, patron-operated doors, can push them open, however, the doors are heavy, so the touch-to-open or push bar mechanism, sends pressurized air to open the doors. Most doors will signify that they are unlocked and open with lights, this gives guide to those who are going up or down the door steps to not trip and fall.

Unlocked or open doors, will trigger a brake locking mechanism on the bus to prevent it from moving while someone could possibly be entering or exiting the bus, when the door is closed, the lock will release, this is mostly implemented on rear doors, not really on front doors, since the driver will be paying attention to the front door.

Types

Transit buses can be single-decker, double-decker, rigid or articulated.  Selection of type has traditionally been made on a regional as well as operational basis; however, with the advent of global manufacturing, all of these types can be seen in the same location or country.  Depending on local policies, transit buses will also usually have two, three or (for articulated) four doors to facilitate rapid boarding and alighting.

In cases of low-demand routes, or to navigate small local streets, some models of minibus and small midibuses have also been used as transit type buses.

The development of the midibus has also given many operators a low-cost way of operating a transit bus service, with some midibuses such as the Plaxton SPD Super Pointer Dart resembling full size transit type vehicles.

Developments

Due to their public transport role, transit buses were the first type of bus to benefit from low-floor technology, in response to a demand for equal access public service provision.  Transit buses are also now subject to various disability discrimination acts in several jurisdictions which dictate various design features also applied to other vehicles in some cases.

Due to the high number of high-profile urban operations, transit buses are at the forefront of bus electrification, with hybrid electric bus, all-electric bus and fuel cell bus development and testing aimed at reducing fuel usage, shift to green electricity and decreasing environmental impact.

Developments of the transit bus towards higher capacity bus transport include tram-like vehicles such as guided buses, longer bi-articulated buses and tram-like buses such as the Wright StreetCar, often as part of bus rapid transit schemes.  Fare collection is also seeing a shift to off-bus payment, with either the driver or an inspector verifying fare payments.

Commuter bus service

A commuter or express bus service is a fixed-route bus characterized by service predominantly in one direction during peak periods, limited stops, use of multi-ride tickets and routes of extended length, usually between the central business district and outlying suburbs. Commuter bus service also may include other service, characterized by a limited route structure, limited stops and a coordinated relationship with another mode of transportation. They may closely follow the routing of a conventional bus route but not stopping at every stop or not making detours such as into residential or commercial areas that conventional routes may take.

See also
 Electric bus
 Highway bus
 Intercity bus service
 List of buses (list of types of transit buses)
 Trolleybus
 Public transport

External links

Buses by type